Butte Creek Canyon is an unincorporated community and census-designated place (CDP) in Butte County, California. Butte Creek Canyon sits at an elevation of 1024 feet (312 m) in the Sierra Nevada foothills. The 2010 United States census reported Butte Creek Canyon's population was 1,086. In November 2018, the Camp Fire destroyed a large portion of the town.

Demographics

At the 2010 census Butte Creek Canyon had a population of 1,086. The racial makeup of Butte Creek Canyon was 1,011 (93.1%) White, 0 (0.0%) African American, 20 (1.8%) Native American, 18 (1.7%) Asian, 1 (0.1%) Pacific Islander, 8 (0.7%) from other races, and 28 (2.6%) from two or more races. Hispanic or Latino of any race were 48 people (4.4%).

The whole population lived in households, no one lived in non-institutionalized group quarters and no one was institutionalized.

There were 468 households, 105 (22.4%) had children under the age of 18 living in them, 282 (60.3%) were opposite-sex married couples living together, 18 (3.8%) had a female householder with no husband present, 15 (3.2%) had a male householder with no wife present.  There were 30 (6.4%) unmarried opposite-sex partnerships, and 2 (0.4%) same-sex married couples or partnerships. 110 households (23.5%) were one person and 46 (9.8%) had someone living alone who was 65 or older. The average household size was 2.32.  There were 315 families (67.3% of households); the average family size was 2.74.

The age distribution was 169 people (15.6%) under the age of 18, 51 people (4.7%) aged 18 to 24, 188 people (17.3%) aged 25 to 44, 517 people (47.6%) aged 45 to 64, and 161 people (14.8%) who were 65 or older.  The median age was 52.6 years. For every 100 females, there were 106.1 males.  For every 100 females age 18 and over, there were 108.9 males.

There were 522 housing units at an average density of 25.5 per square mile (9.8/km),of which 468 were occupied, 394 (84.2%) by the owners and 74 (15.8%) by renters.  The homeowner vacancy rate was 1.2%; the rental vacancy rate was 7.4%.  924 people (85.1% of the population) lived in owner-occupied housing units and 162 people (14.9%) lived in rental housing units.

References

Census-designated places in Butte County, California
Populated places in the Sierra Nevada (United States)
Census-designated places in California